Mole Listening Pearls is a German record label based in Mannheim. From 1996 till 2003 it was owned by UCMG; in 2004 Mole Listening Pearls was overtaken by Daredo Music. The name "Mole" is from the novel "Neuromancer" in which mole is a kind of computer virus.

Since 1996 various artists of electronic music, like Alphawezen, Bassface Sascha, De-Phazz, Lemongrass, moodorama, Naomi, Wax Tailor, Barbara Lahr,  Yonderboi and Zagar have been released on this label.

The first records were compilations. On "Science Jazz Vol. 1", arranged by the Zurich DJ Minus 8, you could find artists like Nightmares on Wax, LTJ Bukem and Lamb, on "Breaking The Ice" you can find, among others, Kruder & Dorfmeister and Red Snapper. From 1997 on individual artists have been signed by this label. The debut album "Detunized Gravity" (1997) by De-Phazz and Yonderboi's debut album "Shallow and Profound" were a big success, as they sold over 30 000 copies. As of August 2008, 84 albums of 31 Bands have been released. Still, various compilations will be released. These compilations act as an overview of all artists and their production on one hand, and there are a number of programmatical demands for certain music styles on the other. For instance "Batacuda" – already three follow-ups have been released between 2000 and 2007 – has afro-percussive influenced tracks, while "Science Fiction Jazz" with its eleven editions between 1996 until 2008, made a fundamental contribution to the evolution of NuJazz.

Current active bands 

Alphawezen
Anima Sound System
De Phazz
moodorama
Mourah
Yonderboi

External links
 Mole Listening Pearls official website
 Label profile from Mole Listening Pearls

Electronic music record labels
German independent record labels
Companies based in Mannheim